The City of Rockhampton was a local government area in the Central Queensland region of Queensland, Australia, encompassing most of the suburban area of the regional city of Rockhampton.

History 
The Borough of Rockhampton was proclaimed as Queensland's fourth municipality (after Borough of Brisbane, Borough of Ipswich and Borough of Toowoomba) on 13 December 1860 under the Municipalities Act 1858, a piece of New South Wales legislation inherited by Queensland when it became a separate colony in 1859. It held its first election on 26 February 1861 and its inaugural meeting on 1 March 1861. The municipality had an area of  located on the south bank of the Fitzroy River and had a population of about 600. In 1864, the council was divided into three wards—Fitzroy, Archer and Leichhardt. A proposal to greatly expand its area southwards to include Gracemere and Bouldercombe was rejected in part due to opposition from influential squatters in the area. It achieved a measure of autonomy in 1878 with the enactment of the Local Government Act.

On 11 November 1879, the Gogango Division was established as one of 74 divisions around Queensland under the Divisional Boards Act 1879. It covered an area of  surrounding the municipality—an area significantly greater than the modern Rockhampton Regional Council covers.

Fitzroy Bridge was built to span the Fitzroy River in 1882, and a year later in September 1883, the Borough of North Rockhampton was proclaimed. North Rockhampton had a somewhat unhappy 36-year existence—its small population and location opposite the stronger and wealthier Rockhampton borough made comparisons inevitable and development of its own identity almost impossible. In 1919, it was described as a "small and straggling hamlet". Nevertheless, it was able to get a loan to construct a Municipal Chambers in 1885, which was completed in December of that year. The town clerk's arrest for embezzlement in 1890 marked the beginning of a period of difficulties characterised by disputes with the surrounding Gogango Divisional Board over road construction, and internal conflict between members of council, in which the Queensland Government was often requested to intervene. It did not have a reliable water supply and at the time of its amalgamation was still trying to raise funds for a dam.

Although a foundation stone was laid for a town hall in 1897, it was not until 1941 that the Rockhampton Town Hall was completed.

With the passage of the Local Authorities Act 1902, Rockhampton became one of three former municipalities, alongside Brisbane and Townsville, to become a City on 31 March 1903, while North Rockhampton became the Town of North Rockhampton.

The State Government became concerned in 1918 after both the City of Rockhampton and Town of North Rockhampton councils proposed separate water infrastructure projects. On Saturday 25 January 1919, an amalgamation referendum held in North Rockhampton passed with 884 of the 1,029 votes cast in favour. On 15 March 1919, elections for the new four-ward council with 11 councillors took place, with their first meeting being held five days later. North Rockhampton Borough Chambers, located in Stapleton Park, Berserker, became a Main Roads office for about four decades, and eventually was restored and, since 1985, has been the home of Rockhampton and District Historical Society.

Wards were abolished at some point and were not reintroduced until 1982, when the council was restructured with 10 divisions each electing one councillor, plus a mayor elected by the entire City. On 1 July 1984, the City grew northwards by annexing Parkhurst, where its water treatment facility was being constructed, from the Shire of Livingstone. The council tried on several occasions to expand further into the Livingstone and Fitzroy areas, but a referendum in Fitzroy on 9 February 1991 was opposed by 83% of valid votes cast.

On 15 March 2008, under the Local Government (Reform Implementation) Act 2007 passed by the Parliament of Queensland on 10 August 2007, the City of Rockhampton merged with the Shires of Livingstone, Fitzroy and Mount Morgan to form the Rockhampton Region.

The Rockhampton Regional Library opened in 2008 at the time of the amalgamations.  The Rockhampton North Library opening in 1971.

Facilities 
The Rockhampton Regional Council Library Services operates its headquarters library at 230 Bolsover Street, Rockhampton. Other public libraries within the region are at Rockhampton North (15 Berserker Street) and Mount Morgan (31 Morgan Street).

Suburbs 
The City of Rockhampton included the following settlements:

 Allenstown
 Berserker
 Depot Hill
 Fairy Bower
 Frenchville
 Kawana
 Koongal
 Lakes Creek*
 Limestone Creek
 Mount Archer
 Norman Gardens
 Park Avenue
 Parkhurst
 Port Curtis
 Rockhampton City
 The Common
 The Range
 Wandal
 West Rockhampton

* – shared with the Shire of Livingstone

Population

Mayors 
The mayors of Rockhampton were:
 1861 John Palmer
 1862 P. D. Mansfield  
 1863 P. D. Mansfield and R McKelliget  
 1864 Richard McKelliget  
 1865 Edward Pike Livermor  
 1866 Robert Miller Hunter  
 1867 Robert Miller Hunter  
 1868 Robert Miller Hunter  
 1869 Robert Miller Hunter  
 1870 T. Macdonald Paterson and C Scardon  
 1871 Edward Pike Livermore  
 1872 Edward Pike Livermore  
 1873 Edward Pike Livermore  
 1874 William Pattison  
 1875 John Macfarlane  
 1876 John Macfarlane  
 1877 William George Jackson  
 1878 William George Jackson 
 1879 Albrecht Feez
 1880 John Ferguson 
 1881 John Ferguson 
 1882 Robert Sharples 
 1883 John Ferguson 
 1884 James Williamson 
 1885 Jabet Wakefield 
 1886 Thomas Kelly 
 1887 Thomas Kelly 
 1888 Sidney Williams 
 1889 Sidney William 
 1890 Thomas Kay Higson 
 1891 Frederick Augustus Morgan
 1892 Frederick Augustus Morgan
 1893 Frederick Augustus Morgan
 1894 Hugh Fiddes 
 1895 Stewart Williamson Hartley 
 1896 W. Wilson Littler 
 1897 W. Wilson Littler 
 1896 Hugh Fiddes 
 1899 Hugh Fiddes 
 1900 Thomas Pennington  or R. Tallon 
 1901 Henry W. Johnson  
 1902 S. Thomasson  
 1903 Thomas Henderson  
 1904 Arthur H Parnell  
 1905 Harry Medcraf  
 1906 Thomas Connolly  
 1907 Arthur H. Parnell 
 1908 Harry Medcraf 
 1909 John Edgar 
 1910 George Wilkinson 
 1911 Harry Medcraf 
 1912 Arthur H. Parnell 
 1913 Thomas B. Renshaw 
 1914 William Farrell 
 1915 Theo W. Kingel and John Morrison 
 1916 John Morrison 
 1917 Theo W. Kingel 
 1918 Charles Oliver Gough 
 1919 Theo W. Kingel 
 1920 Robert Elliott Hartley 
 1921 William Charlton 
 1922 William Charlton 
 1923 William Charlton 
 1924 Theodor William Kingel 
 1925 Theodor William Kingel 
 1926. Theodor William Kingel 
 1927. Thomas Dunlop
 1928. Thomas Dunlop
 1929. Thomas Dunlop
 1929 Joseph Jeffries
 1929–30 Robert Cousins
 1930–36 Thomas Joseph Lee
 1936–43 Robert William Evans
 1943–52 Henry Jeffries
 1952–1982 Rex Pilbeam
 1982–1991 Jim Webber 
 1991–1997 Lea Taylor
 1997– 2000 Jim McRae
 2000–2008: Margaret Strelow (who would be elected as the second mayor of the Rockhampton Region in 2012)

References

|}

City of Rockhampton
Former local government areas of Queensland
1860 establishments in Australia
2008 disestablishments in Australia
Populated places disestablished in 2008